The Ravan Baku 2011–12 season was Ravan Baku's first Azerbaijan Premier League season, which they finished in 8th place. They also took part in the 2011–12 Azerbaijan Cup, getting knocked out in the first round by FK Baku on penalties. Ravan Baku started the season under Bahman Hasanov who Resigned on 20 September 2011, being replaced by Vladislav Kadyrov who in turn was sacked on 5 February 2012, to be replaced by Bahman Hasanov.

Squad
Transfers
Summer

In:

 

 

 

 

 

 

Out:

Winter

In:

Out:

 

 

Competitions
Azerbaijan Premier League

Results summary

Results by round

Results

Table

Azerbaijan Premier League Relegation Group

Table

Azerbaijan Cup

Squad statistics

Appearances and goals

|-
|colspan="14"|Players who appeared for Raven Baku no longer at the club:''

|}

Goal scorers

Disciplinary record

References

External links 
 Ravan Baku at Soccerway.com
 

Ravan Baku
Ravan Baku FC seasons